Laos–Myanmar relations is the long, complicated relationship between two neighbors, Laos and Myanmar. Myanmar has an embassy in Vientiane and Laos has an embassy in Yangon.

History and modern relations
While both countries share common Theravada Buddhism, two countries often engaged in war from 16th century onward. The Taungoo dynasty had conquered Laos during the reign of Bayinnaung. Setthathirath led the Lan Xang Kingdom into a resistance war against the Burmese but failed. With the collapse of Taungoo Empire, the Laotians soon restored their nation from the Burmese.

The Burmese would go on conquer Laos for the second time as Konbaung dynasty, and Lan Xang this time was unable to fend off again. Similar to the first invasion, Burma would go on crippled due to war with the Chinese that saw Lan Xang regained independence for the second time.

At 19th century, both would go on to become British and French colony separately. Since then, there had been no relationship between two and the Vietnam War occurred near Laotian border also prevented Laos and Burma from establishing official relations. Only started from 1990s, Laos and Myanmar established official tie.

Cooperation
Since 1990s, increasing cooperation started as both joined the ASEAN.

In 2015, the first official friendship bridge between two was opened. Two countries have attempted to expand bilateral trades and cooperations within.

See also
 Laos–Myanmar border

References

Further reading
International Boundary Study No. 33 – June 18, 1964 Burma – Laos Boundary

 
Myanmar
Laos
Relations of colonizer and former colony